Conrad the Cat is a fictional animated Warner Bros. character who was created by Chuck Jones, and starred in three shorts in the 1940s.

He was voiced by Mel Blanc in the first two shorts, and Pinto Colvig in Conrad the Sailor. Conrad having been voiced by Colvig, has been compared to Goofy, but has been criticized as having "only mannerisms (he rubs his nose a lot and grins, and giggles foolishly), and not a personality."

Shorts 
He first appeared in the 1942 color short The Bird Came C.O.D. before featuring in Porky's Cafe (in black and white) and Conrad the Sailor (in color). In Porky's Cafe, Conrad appeared with Porky Pig; in Conrad the Sailor, he appears with Daffy Duck. All shorts were released in 1942.

References

External links 

Looney Tunes characters
Anthropomorphic cats
Film characters introduced in 1942